Istanbul University is a prominent public research university located in Istanbul, Turkey. 

Founded by Mehmed II on May 30, 1453, a day after the conquest of Constantinople by the Turks, it was reformed in 1846 as the first Ottoman higher education institution based on European traditions. The successor institution, which has been operating under its current name since 1933, is the first university in modern Turkey. Some pre-1930 Western sources refer to it as the University of Constantinople, after the previous name of the city, while one in French referred to it as the Université de Stamboul ("Stamboul" the name for the historic inner city).

At present, there are 66,487 undergraduate, graduate, and doctoral students studying in 33 academic units, including faculties, institutes, colleges, and vocational schools at 10 campuses. The main campus is adjacent to Beyazıt Square in Fatih, the capital district of the province, on the European side of the city.  

Strict entry requirements (Some faculties require scoring among the top 1% of over 2 million applicants at the national university entrance examination every year) posit the University as one of the most prestigious in Turkey. Besides being a member of the Coimbra Group, the University took first place in Turkey and was globally placed in the top 500 according to the Academic Ranking of World Universities published in 2022. Moreover, Istanbul University is ranked in the top 25 at the QS Universities In Emerging Europe And Central Asia 2021 Ranking. In 2020, the university's AACSB accredited Business School was ranked 2nd in Turkey, according to Eduniversal. The Faculty of Transport and Logistics is accredited by the International Road and Transport Union. In addition, the Faculty of Natural Sciences represents Turkey in four major studies conducted by the European Organization for Nuclear Research.

Istanbul University alumni include 2 Nobel laureates, Aziz Sancar (in Chemistry) and Orhan Pamuk (in Literature), the longest-serving President of Israel Yitzhak Ben-Zvi, two Prime Ministers of Israel (David Ben-Gurion and Moshe Sharett), President of Turkey Abdullah Gül, six Prime Ministers of Turkey (Suat Hayri Ürgüplü, Sadi Irmak, Nihat Erim, Refik Saydam, Naim Talu, Yıldırım Akbulut), and the current Mayor of Istanbul Ekrem İmamoğlu.

History 

Origins of Istanbul University go back to 1453, when it was founded by the Ottoman Sultan Mehmed II "as a school of philosophy, medicine, law and letters". There was also the University of Constantinople, which was founded in 425 and rebranded as Phanar Greek Orthodox College after the Fall of Constantinople. Istanbul University functioned as a Medrese (Islamic theological school) as well. This madrasa is regarded as the precursor to the Darülfünûn, which evolved into Istanbul University in 1933. Education in a number of sciences and fields (such as medicine, mathematics, astronomy, cartography, geography, history, philosophy, religion, literature, philology, law, etc.) became available, and, until the 19th century, they were instrumental in educating the ruling cadres of the Ottoman society. However, when the medreses were no longer able to meet the needs of the modern world, a restructuring process began, and as a result, the institutions of higher education called Darülfünûn, the core of Istanbul University, was established.

An institution of higher education named the Darülfünûn-u Osmanî (دار الفنون عثماني) (Ottoman Polytechnic Institute) was created in 1863, but suppressed in 1871. Its first rector was Hasan Tahsini, regarded as one of the most important Ottoman scholars of the 19th century. In 1874 the Imperial Polytechnic Institute (Darülfünûn-u Sultanî) (دار الفنون سلطاني) started classes in law in French, but was closed in 1881.

The Imperial University, now known as Darülfünûn-u Şahâne (دار الفنون شهانه) was refounded in 1900, with the departments of theology, arts, mathematics, science and philology. In 1924, the faculties of law, medicine, arts and sciences were established in Istanbul University (İstanbul Darülfünûnu), as the university was now called. Islamic theology was added in 1925, but in 1933 the university was reorganized without the latter.

 The first modern Applied Physics courses were given at the Darülfünûn on 31 December 1863, which marked the beginning of a new period, and on 20 February 1870, the school was renamed as the Darülfünûn-u Osmanî (Ottoman House of Multiple Sciences) and reorganized to meet the needs of modern sciences and technologies. Starting from 1874, some classes of Literature, Law and Applied Sciences were given at the building of Galatasaray High School, which continued regularly until 1881. On 1 September 1900, the school was renamed and reorganized as the Darülfünûn-u Şahâne (Royal Polytechnic Institute) with courses on Mathematics, Literature and Theology. On 20 April 1912, the school was renamed as the İstanbul Darülfünûnu (Istanbul Polytechnic Institute) while the number of courses were increased and the curricula were modernized with the establishment of the Schools of Medicine, Law, Applied Sciences (Physics, Chemistry, Mathematics), Literature and Theology.

On 21 April 1924, the Republic of Turkey recognized the İstanbul Darülfünûnu as a state school, and on 7 October 1925, the administrative autonomy of İstanbul Darülfünûnu was recognized while the Schools (within the old Medrese system) became modern Faculties. The Darülfünûnu counted with five faculties: medicine, law, letters, theology and science. The professors of the Darülfünûnu had academic freedom as mentioned in Article 2 of Law 493 

On 1 August 1933, İstanbul Darülfünûnu was reorganized as İstanbul Üniversitesi (Istanbul University) following the educational reforms of Mustafa Kemal Atatürk. Classes officially began on 1 November 1933.

Campus

The university has seventeen faculties on five campuses; the main campus being on Beyazıt Square, which was originally built by Constantine the Great as the Forum Tauri and was later enlarged by Theodosius the Great as the Forum of Theodosius during the Roman period.

The main campus building with its landmark gate was previously used as the headquarters of the Harbiye Nezareti (Ministry of War) by the Ottoman government. The grounds were previously the location of the Ottoman era Eski Saray (Old Palace). Some Roman and Byzantine ruins are still visible on the grounds.

The university has a teaching staff of 2,000 professors and associates and 4,000 assistants and younger staff. More than 60,000 undergraduate and 8,000 postgraduate students follow the courses offered by Istanbul University every year.

The main gate was depicted on the reverse of the Turkish 500 lira banknotes of 1971–1984.

Faculties 
 Faculty of Medicine
 Faculty of Law
 Faculty of Literature
 Faculty of Science
 Faculty of Economics
 Faculty of Pharmacy
 Faculty of Dentistry
 Faculty of Management
 Faculty of Political Sciences
 Faculty of Communication
 Faculty of Aquatic Sciences
 Faculty of Theology
 Faculty of Transportation and Logistics
 Faculty of Nursing
 Faculty of Architecture
 Faculty of Open and Distance Education

International perspective and rankings 
Istanbul University School of Business is the only AACSB-Accredited Business School among the public universities in Turkey.

In the QS World University Rankings 2022, Istanbul University is ranked at 801–1000th globally. In the broad subject areas, it is ranked 293rd in "Life Sciences and Medicine", 342nd in "Arts and Humanities", and 401-450th in "Social Sciences and Management". In the specific subject areas, it is ranked at 251-300th in "Law and Legal Studies", 251-300th in "Modern Languages", 251-300th in "Agriculture & Forestry", 251-300th in "Pharmacy & Pharmacology", 301–350th in "Medicine", 401-450th in "Biological Sciences", 401-450th in "Business & Management Studies", 551-600th in "Computer Science and Information Systems", and 601-630th in "Chemistry".

In the Academic Ranking of World Universities 2019, Istanbul University is ranked at 401–500th worldwide (1st in Turkey). It is also ranked at 251–300th in "Veterinary Sciences", 401–500th in "Clinical Medicine", 101–150th in "Dentistry & Oral Sciences", 201–300th in "Nursing", and 301–400th in "Medical Technology".

In 2020, Times Higher Education ranked the university top 1000 in the world, 301–400th in "Clinical, pre-clinical and health", 401–500th in "Education", 501–600th in "Social Sciences", and 601–800th in "Life Sciences".

The Best Global Universities Ranking 2021 of the U.S. News & World Report ranks Istanbul University 714th in the world, 225th in "Surgery", 243rd in "Clinical Medicine", 195th in "Endocrinology and Metabolism", 255th in "Neuroscience and Behavior", 383rd in "Molecular Biology and Genetics", 442nd in "Plant and Animal Science", 446th in "Biology and Biochemistry", and 593rd in "Physics".

By CWTS Leiden Ranking 2019, Istanbul University is ranked 335th (overall), 196th in "Biomedical and Health Sciences", 374th in "Life and Earth Sciences", 669th in "Mathematics and Computer Science", 544th in "Physical Sciences and Engineering", and 570th in "Social Sciences and Humanities".

By Round University Ranking 2019, Istanbul University is ranked 529th in the world, 490th in "Humanities", 496th in "Life Sciences", 329th in "Medical Sciences", 556th in "Natural Sciences", 506th in "Social Sciences" and 600th in "Technical Sciences".

Notable faculty 
See the page Academic staff of Istanbul University.

Notable alumni
See also Istanbul University alumni for a detailed list.
Turkish Presidents

Abdullah Gül

Foreign Presidents

David Ben-Gurion, Founder and the First Prime Minister of Israel
Yitzhak Ben-Zvi, the Longest-Serving President of Israel

Speakers of the Turkish parliament

Ferruh Bozbeyli
Fuat Sirmen

Turkish Prime Ministers

Foreign Prime Ministers

David Ben-Gurion, Founder and the First Prime Minister of Israel
Moshe Sharett, Prime Minister of Israel

Turkish Ministers

Cemil Çiçek
Mehmet Ali Şahin

Politicians

Ali Tanrıyar – Former Minister of Interior
Cemil Çiçek – Former Speaker of the Parliament
Coşkun Kırca – Former Minister of Foreign Affairs
Ekrem İmamoğlu – Current Mayor of Istanbul
Erkan Mumcu – Former Minister of Culture and Tourism / Minister of Education / Minister of Tourism
Ertuğrul Mat – Former Bursa deputy
Hayati Yazıcı – Former Minister of Customs and Trade
İhsan Sabri Çağlayangil – Former Minister of Foreign Affairs
Kadir Topbaş – Former Mayor of Istanbul
Köksal Toptan – Former Speaker of the Parliament
Masud Sabri – Pharmacist and former Governor of Xinjiang province in China
Meral Akşener – Leader of Good Party
Murat Başesgioğlu – Former Minister of Labor and Social Security
Mustafa Bey Barmada – Former Governor General of the State of Aleppo
Naci Ağbal – Former Minister of Finance
Nimet Bas – Former Minister of Education

Journalists

Scientists

Writers

Poets

Attila İlhan
Onat Kutlar
Orhan Veli

Musicians

Other

Gallery

See also 

 Istanbul University, Cerrahpaşa
 Balkan Universities Network
 
 List of modern universities in Europe (1801–1945)
 Istanbul University Observatory
 Beyazıt Tower
 Education in the Ottoman Empire
 Dar ul-Funun (Persia)

References

External links 

 Istanbul University website 
 History of Istanbul University (Turkish)

 
1874 establishments in the Ottoman Empire
1933 establishments in Turkey
Ottoman architecture in Istanbul
Universities established in the 20th century
Fatih
Avcılar, Istanbul
1453 establishments in the Ottoman Empire
Educational institutions established in the 15th century